Louisburgh GAA (Gaelige: CLG Cluain Cearbán) is a Gaelic football club located in Louisburgh, County Mayo, Ireland. They are based in west Mayo.

Achievements
 Connacht Junior Club Football Championship Winners 2016

References

Gaelic football clubs in County Mayo
Hurling clubs in County Mayo
Gaelic games clubs in County Mayo